Imparables is the last studio album of the duo Magnate & Valentino with the duo separating immediately after the release with each carrying their careers as solo artists.

Track list
"Hasta El Amanecer" (3:35)
"A Media Luz" (feat. Lui-G 21 Plus) (3:52)
"Bésame La Boca" (3:20)
"Hagamos El Amor" (Nengo Flow) (4:33)
"Con Los 2 A Las Vez" (4:00)
"Sin Ti" (4:59)
"Revivir La Aventura" (feat. Jory Boy) (3:59)
"Instinto Animal" (4:13)
"El Remate" (3:44)
"Tu Recuerdo" (feat. Gotay El Autentiko) (2:53)
"El Party" (3:30)
"Regresa Ya" (feat. Yelsid) (3:51)
"Con Los 2 A La Vez" (Censured) (3:58)

Magnate & Valentino albums
2013 albums